The 2019–20 Super 6 (also known as the Fosroc Super 6 for sponsorship reasons) is the inaugural season of a semi-professional rugby union competition for Scotland's club sides.

The six teams are competing in the Super 6 this season are Ayrshire Bulls, Boroughmuir Bears, Heriot's Rugby, Stirling County, Watsonians and Southern Knights.

Competition format

 League Stage

All sides will play each other home and away.

 League Play-Offs

The 1st placed team in the league stage then plays the 4th best team in that stage.

The 2nd placed team in the league stage plays the 3rd best team in that stage.

The 5th placed team in the league plays the 6th best team in that stage at home.

 Final

The winners of the 1st-4th match will play the winners of the 2nd-3rd match to determine the winners of the Super 6 tournament and the runners-up.

The losers of the 1st-4th match will play the losers of the 2nd-3rd match to determine the 3rd & 4th place slots.

The 6th best team in the league plays the 5th best team in that stage at home. The home and away format will determine 5th and 6th place.

The final was due to take place at Scotstoun Stadium, the home of Glasgow Warriors.

Coronavirus pandemic

Due to the coronavirus pandemic the Scottish Rugby Union made season 2019-20 null and void. This meant that the Super 6 fixtures ended after the 10 rounds of the League Stage and did not continue into the Super 6 play-offs.

The cross-border competition that was scheduled between Super 6 clubs and Welsh clubs was also cancelled due to the coronavirus pandemic.

Table

League stage rounds

All times are local.

Round 1

Round 2

Round 3

Round 4

The Heriot's Rugby v Stirling County match was cancelled on the morning of the 30 November 2019 due to overnight frost.

The Ayrshire Bulls v Watsonians pitch was deemed unplayable and the match was cancelled shortly before kick off.

The Boroughmuir Bears v Southern Knights match was called off at a pitch inspection at 10.30am on the morning of the match. The postponement due to a frozen pitch.

Round 5

Round 6

Round 4 re-scheduled

Round 7

Round 8

Round 9

Round 10

Team of the Tournament

The 2019–20 Super 6 team of the tournament was named as follows:-

Leading Points scorers

The leading points scorers from the League Stage rounds of the competition.

Leading Try scorers

The leading try scorers from the League Stage rounds of the competition.

References

External links
SRU Super 6

 
2019–20 in European rugby union leagues
2019-20
2019–20 in Scottish rugby union
Super 6